Lee Sun-Ja (born May 23, 1978) is a South Korean sprint canoer who competed in the late 2000s. At the 2008 Summer Olympics in Beijing, she was eliminated in the heats of the K-1 500 m event.

External links
Sports-Reference.com profile

1978 births
Canoeists at the 2008 Summer Olympics
Living people
Olympic canoeists of South Korea
South Korean female canoeists
Asian Games medalists in canoeing
Canoeists at the 2002 Asian Games
Canoeists at the 2006 Asian Games
Canoeists at the 2014 Asian Games
Canoeists at the 2018 Asian Games
Medalists at the 2006 Asian Games
Medalists at the 2014 Asian Games
Medalists at the 2018 Asian Games
Asian Games silver medalists for South Korea
Asian Games bronze medalists for South Korea